Kent Andersson (August 1, 1942 – August 29, 2006) was a Swedish professional motorcycle road racer. He competed in Grand Prix motorcycle racing between 1966 to 1975, most prominently as a member of the Yamaha factory racing team where he was a two-time 125cc World Champion. Andersson was notable for being the only Swedish rider to win an FIM road racing world championship.



Motorcycle racing career
Born in Landvetter, Sweden, Andersson rode in his first national championship races at the age of 19 in Sweden and Denmark on a Monark in the 250 cc class. He then rode a 250 cc Bultaco for the 1962 season. He proved himself to be a capable competitor.

After winning the 250cc Swedish national championship in 1965, Andersson moved up to the world championships competing with Husqvarna bikes that he modified himself. He bought a Yamaha 250 cc production racer and began posting solid results. In 1969 he finished second in the 250 championship after a season-long battle with Santiago Herrero and eventual champion Kel Carruthers. These impressive results earned him a place on the Yamaha factory 250 cc racing team as Rod Gould's teammate for the 1970 season, in which he finished third.

Yamaha chose Andersson to help develop their TA125 racebike for the 1971 season. He went on to finish second in the 1972 on the water-cooled development model designated YZ623C, and claim the 1973 125cc World Championship. In 1974, he successfully defended his title by winning five races along with two second-place finishes.

Andersson retired after finishing 3rd in the 1975 season and took a position at Yamaha Europe's Developing and Constructing Department. Among other projects, Andersson had an important role in developing the three-cylinder 350 cc bike that Takazumi Katayama rode to win the 350cc road racing world championship in 1977. Andersson continued racing in his later years just for fun at an amateur level in Sweden, but did so well that he won the Supermono National Championship in 1995 at the age of 53. He was a successful member of Ferry Brouwer's Dutch Yamaha Classic Racing Team. He often participated in classic exhibition races all over Europe. Andersson sometimes served as expert Road Racing commentator for Swedish Eurosport. Andersson died in August 2006 in Landvetter at the age of 64.

Grand Prix motorcycle racing results 
Points system from 1950 to 1968:

Points system from 1969 onwards:

(key) (Races in bold indicate pole position; races in italics indicate fastest lap)

References 

Swedish motorcycle racers
50cc World Championship riders
125cc World Championship riders
250cc World Championship riders
350cc World Championship riders
Sportspeople from Gothenburg
People from Härryda Municipality
2006 deaths
1942 births
125cc World Riders' Champions